In enzymology, a cholesterol 25-hydroxylase is an enzyme that catalyzes the chemical reaction

cholesterol + AH2 + O2  25-hydroxycholesterol + A + H2O

The 3 substrates of this enzyme are cholesterol, an electron acceptor AH2, and O2, whereas its 3 products are 25-hydroxycholesterol (25HC), the reduction product A, and H2O.

This enzyme belongs to the family of oxidoreductases, specifically those acting on paired donors, with O2 as oxidant and incorporation or reduction of oxygen. The oxygen incorporated need not be derive from O miscellaneous.  The systematic name of this enzyme class is cholesterol, hydrogen-donor:oxygen oxidoreductase (25-hydroxylating). This enzyme is also called cholesterol 25-monooxygenase.

Transcripts for this enzyme have been identified in macrophages from the testis.

CH25H is an interferon-stimulated gene, and its primary product 25HC may have broad-spectrum antiviral activity, demonstrated in mice against HIV, ebola, Nipah virus, Rift Valley Fever virus, and SARS-CoV-2. Specifically, 25HC blocks membrane fusion between the cell and virus, and may "implicate membrane-modifying oxysterols as potential antiviral therapeutics.” Recently, upregulation of CH25H has been shown to play a role in effectively restricting infection of lung epithelial cells with SARS-Cov-2 through its enzymatic product, 25HC, which depletes accessible membrane cholesterol so that the virus is unable to achieve fusion with the cell membrane necessary for entry and infection.

It has been proposed, based on experimental research in both mice and human cell culture, that 25HC is a potent senolytic. Further research needs to elaborate on this research and reveal its true significance to aging.

References

Further reading 

 
 
 
 
 

EC 1.14.99
Enzymes of unknown structure